Natallia Tsylinskaya (born 30 August 1975) is an international cyclist who specialises in track sprinting. Tsylinskaya is an eight-time World Champion and an Olympic bronze medalist.

Early life
Under the direction of her trainer, Alexander Beljatsky, who rode for Russia's road racing team Dynamo, Tsylinskaya won the Youth USSR Championship at the age of 14. At age 16, in 1993, she traveled to Sydney, Australia, to participate in the Junior World Championships, where she won a bronze medal.

Return to cycling
Tsylinskaya stepped away from professional cycling to start her family, but Belarusian authorities convinced Natallia to return to competitive cycling during the winter of 1998. As Minsk did not have a track or adequate training facilities, Tsylinskaya moved to Moscow, where she trained.

At the 2000 World Championships in Manchester, England, she won gold in both the 500mTT and the Sprint, but these results alone were insufficient to qualify for the 2000 Summer Olympics in Sydney. In 2001, she teamed up with Russian trainer, Stanislav Solovyev (Станислав Соловьев), who remained her coach throughout her career. She won gold for both the sprint and 500mTT events at three of the four world cups in that year but did not gain a medal at the 2001 World Championships in Antwerp, Belgium. She also suffered a severe crash during the sprint qualification rounds, in which she broke her collarbone.

Championships from 2002 to 2004
Riding for the first time in international competition under her maiden name of Tsylinskaya, she began the 2002 season by winning both the sprint and 500mTT events at the World Cup races in Mexico City and Moscow. She followed this by winning gold in both the 500mTT and sprint events at the 2002 World Championships in Ballerup, Denmark.

In the World Championships of 2003 in Stuttgart, Germany, she won gold in the 500mTT event, posting a time of 34.078 seconds, her personal best time. However, in the sprint event, Tsylinskaya competed against Russian track cyclist Svetlana Grankovskaya in the final, and lost in two straight heats, so she took second place.

In 2004, the focus was on the Athens Olympics that took place in August. After victories in World Cup races earlier that year, at the World Championships in Melbourne, Australia in May 2004, she collided with British rider Victoria Pendleton's wheel in the sprint and bruised her right hip in the crash. In the following 500mTT competition, she finished eighth, with Anna Meares winning the event. On 20 August 2004, Tsylinskaya took the bronze medal, her only Olympic medal, in the 500m time trial.

Season 2005 – season 2006
At beginning of the new season, Tsylinskaya expanded her training routine to incorporate Keirin racing.  She began the season by appearing at the Los Angeles World Cup, winning gold in the 500mTT and the sprint and winning bronze in the Keirin (losing to Victoria Pendleton and Anna Meares). One month later, in January 2005, Natallia rode at the Manchester World Cup, where she won gold in the Keirin event The World Championships were held in Los Angeles. She won gold in the 500mTT race over Anna Meares by .014 seconds but was beaten in the sprint by Kerrie Meares, after being relegated and subsequently disqualified in the quarterfinals for performing a dangerous maneuver. In the second round of the Keirin event, Tsylinskaya fell whilst trying to muscle her way into the lead. Tsylinskaya sustained mild, superficial injuries as well as a moderate concussion.

The 2006 season began at the Moscow World Cup where she won gold in both the 500mTT event and the sprint. At the Manchester World Cup, she consolidated her season dominance in the 500mTT by taking gold on the first day. A day later, she came second in the sprint, losing out to Victoria Pendleton after being relegated in the final. In the Los Angeles World Cup, Tsylinskaya again won the 500mTT and the sprint events.

At the 2006 World Championships, Tsylinskaya won gold in the 500mTT event, posting a time of 34.152 seconds. At the later sprint event, Tsylinskaya also took the gold in the sprint event, beating Victoria Pendleton in the final.

Season 2007 – season 2008
The 2007 track cycling season began in Sydney, Australia, where Round 1 of the World Cup series was held from 17 to 19 November 2006.  Tsylinskaya met Great Britain champion Victoria Pendleton in the final of the Sprint competition and was pushed to a deciding third ride before taking the gold medal.

The second round of the World Cup series was held in Moscow, Russia, on 15–17 December. As in Sydney, Tsylinskaya made it through to the final, where she met and bested 19-year-old Cuban Lizandra Guerra. Tsylinskaya had to settle for second place behind Cuban Lizandra Guerra with a time of 34.802 seconds in the 500m time trial.

At the 2008 Summer Olympics in Beijing, she qualified seventh fastest in the preliminary heats for the sprint event. Tsylinskaya was placed sixth overall at the end of the competition.

Union européenne de cyclisme 
As of 2023, Tsylinskaya serves as part of the Management Board of the UEC, the European confederation of national cycling bodies. She also serves as the head of the women's commssion of the UEC.

Family life
Through cycling, Natallia met her first husband, Alexander Markovnichenko, a famous Ukrainian bicycle racer who at the time was a World Champion in the combined team of the USSR. They married in the mid-1990s, moved to Donbas, Ukraine, and Natallia gave birth to their daughter, Masha, in May 1996. She only returned to Minsk occasionally to attend the Academy of Physical Training and Sports, where she studied in absentia and which she completed in 1998.

Tsylinskaya thereafter began a relationship with Russian bicycle racer Andrey Minashkin. The couple wed on 18 October 2002 in a ceremony in Minsk

References

External links

 Cycling News and Photos
 Sportspanorama Belarusian Sports Website
 Union Cycliste International Official Website
 Women's Cycling
 

1975 births
Living people
Belarusian female cyclists
Cyclists at the 2004 Summer Olympics
Cyclists at the 2008 Summer Olympics
Olympic cyclists of Belarus
Olympic medalists in cycling
UCI Track Cycling World Champions (women)
Cyclists from Minsk
Medalists at the 2004 Summer Olympics
Olympic bronze medalists for Belarus
Belarusian track cyclists